Patient education is a planned interactive learning process designed to support and enable expert patients to manage their life with a disease and/or optimise their health and well-being.

Overview
Education may be provided by any healthcare professional who has undertaken appropriate training education, education on patient communication and education is usually included in the healthcare professional's training. However, further training is required to develop specialist skills needed to facilitate self-management and behaviour change.

Health education is also a tool used by managed care plans, and may include both general preventive education or health promotion and disease or condition specific education.

Important elements of patient education are skill building and responsibility: patients need to know when, how, and why they need to make a lifestyle change. Group effort is equally important: each member of the patient's health care team needs to be involved. It can also help the patients by a better lifestyle, it give them the ability to learn new information.

The value of patient education can be summarized as follows:
 Improved understanding of medical condition, diagnosis, disease, or disability.
 Improved understanding of methods and means to manage multiple aspects of medical condition.
 Improved self-advocacy in deciding to act both independently from medical providers and in interdependence with them.
 Increased adherence – Effective communication and patient education increases patient motivation to adhere to treatments.
 Patient outcomes – Patients more likely to respond well to their treatment plan – fewer complications.
 Informed consent – Patients feel you've provided the information they need to make informed decisions
 Empowered to make shared decision - Patients understanding of the evidence of benefits and risks of interventions, helps them to truly weigh the trade-offs they are (un)willing to make.
 Increased health literacy and confidence to navigate the health systems.
 Utilization – More effective use of medical services – fewer unnecessary phone calls and visits.
 Satisfaction and referrals – Patients more likely to stay with your practice and refer other patients.
 Risk Management – Lower risk of malpractice when patients have realistic expectations.
 Race and health – Target education to help reduce the disproportionate burden on populations at increase risk of mortailty.

The competencies of a health educator include the following:
 Incorporate a personal ethic in regards to social responsibilities and services towards others.
 Provide accurate, competent, and evidence-based care.
 Practice preventive health care.
 Focus on relationship-centered care with individuals and their families.
 Incorporate the multiple determinants of health when providing care.
 Be culturally sensitive and be open to a diverse society.
 Use technology appropriately and effectively.
 Be current in the field and continue to advance education.
There are many areas where patient education can improve the outcomes of treatment.
 For example, in patients with amputations, patient education has been shown to be effective when approached from all angles by the healthcare team (nurse, primary care physician, prosthetist, physical therapist, occupational therapist etc.). Support groups have been shown to be a helpful method for dealing with depression in this population. Preoperative patient education helped patients with their decision-making process by informing them of factors related to pain, limb loss, and functional restriction faced after amputation.
 In the case of arthritis, patient education was found to be administered through three methods, including individual face to face meetings with healthcare professionals, patient groups, online support programs. Category I evidence was found for individual, face to face counselling. Meeting with rheumatologists, occupational therapists, physical therapists, nurses, and other healthcare providers was found to be effective in creating adherence to treatment, medication, and for improving  overall patient health.
 In the case of rheumatoid arthritis, patient education has been shown as an effective non-pharmacological treatment. It is recommended that patient education should be the start point and underpin all self-management interventions.
 The role of patient organisations in providing support and structured guidance for people with arthritis is widely valued by professionals and patients.
 It is important to consider patient factors that may help improve outcomes of patient education patient. These are patient activation, illness perceptions, anxiety, participants’ knowledge about their condition, engagement with routine check-ups and positive health behaviours. These factors may be also be targets for patient education.

See also
 Expert Patient Programme
 Compliance (medicine)
 Cultural competence in healthcare
 Green prescription
 Managed care
 Medical writing
 Orem model of nursing

Footnotes

References
 Cordier JF. The expert patient: towards a novel definition. Eur Respir J. 2014 Oct;44(4):853-7. doi: 10.1183/09031936.00027414. PMID 25271227
 Doak, C. C., Doak, L. G., & Root, J. H. (1996). Teaching patients with low literacy skills http://www.hsph.harvard.edu/healthliteracy/doak.html
 London, F. (2009). No Time To Teach: The Essence of Patient and Family Education for Health Care Providers. Atlanta: Pritchett & Hull
 Rankin, S. H., Stallings, K. D., & London, F. (2005). Patient Education in Health and Illness (5th ed.). Philadelphia, PA: Lippincott Williams & Wilkins
 Bastable, S.B, Grambet, P., Jacobs, K., Sopczyk, D.L. (2011). Health professionals as educator: Principles of teaching and learning. Sudbury, MA: Jones & Bartlett Learning, LLC.

Public health education
Health education
Patient